Iskandar Airport  is a military type-C airport in Pangkalan Bun, Central Kalimantan, Indonesia and is the only airport in Central Kalimantan which has an Avtur fuel station. It is the largest military airport in Indonesia, with around a 3,570 hectare area; however, only 200 hectares is currently used for runway and buildings. Iskandar Airport is named after an Indonesian paratrooper from central Kalimantan, Iskandar (1928–1947).

Facilities

Airlines and destinations

References

External links
 

Airports in Central Kalimantan
Indonesian Air Force bases